Odd How People Shake is the first album by the mathcore band Fear Before the March of Flames. It was released in 2003 via Rise Records. On a budget of $1,500, the album was recorded and co-produced with Kris Crummett at Interlace Studios in Hillsboro, Oregon, from April to May 2003, while the band members were still in high school.

It was re-released by Equal Vision Records in January 2004.

Critical reception
Drowned in Sound wrote that "this debut is far from the fully-realised final product, but as blueprints for future releases go, it's pretty special."

Track listing 
All music written by Fear Before the March of Flames. Piano written by Adam Fisher and Kris Crummett.

Personnel
Adam Fisher - guitar, vocals, producer
Brandon Proff - drums, producer, artwork
David Marion - vocals, producer
Mat Clouse - guitar, producer
Mike Madruga - bass, vocals, producer
John Gourley - vocals on "Motelroom.Grandpiano"
Kris Crummett - producer, engineer, all piano
Jason Livermore - mastering

References

2003 debut albums
Fear Before albums
Equal Vision Records albums
Rise Records albums
Albums produced by Kris Crummett